A false document is a technique by which an author aims to increase verisimilitude in a work of fiction by inventing and inserting or mentioning documents that appear to be factual. The goal of a false document is to convince an audience that what is being presented is factual.

In politics
A forged document, the Zinoviev Letter, helped bring the downfall of the first Labour Government in Britain. Conspiracies within secret intelligence services have occurred more recently, leading Harold Wilson  to put in place rules to prevent in the 1960s phone tapping of members of Parliament, for example.

The Protocols of the Elders of Zion, purporting to describe a Jewish plan for global domination, was first published in Russia in 1903, translated into multiple languages, and disseminated internationally in the early part of the 20th century.

In art 
Artist JSG Boggs's life and work have been extensively explored by author and journalist Lawrence Weschler. Boggs drew currency with exceptional care and accuracy, but he only ever drew one side. He then attempted to buy things with the piece of paper upon which he has drawn the currency. His goal was to pass each bill for its face value in common transactions. He bought lunch, clothes, and lodging in this manner, and after the transactions were complete, his bills fetched many times their face value on the art market. Boggs did not make any money from the much larger art market value of his work, only from reselling the goods bought, the change and receipts and other such materials. He was arrested in many countries, and there was much controversy surrounding his work.

Orson Welles' F for Fake is a prime example of a film which is both about falsification (art forgery and the journalism surrounding art forgery) as well as having falsified moments within the film. The movie follows the exploits of a famous art forger, his biographer Clifford Irving, and the subsequent fake autobiography of Howard Hughes that Irving tries to publish. The issues of veracity and forgery are explored in the film, while at the same time, Welles tricks the audience by incorporating fake bits of narrative alongside the documentary footage.

In cross-marketing
There is a long history of producers creating tie-in material to promote and merchandise movies and television shows. Tie-in materials as far-ranging as toys, games, lunch boxes, clothing and so on have all been created and in some cases generate as much or more revenue as the original programming. One big merchandising arena is publishing. In most cases such material is not considered canon within the show's mythology; however, in some instances the books, magazines, etc. are specifically designed by the creators to be canonical. With the rise of the Internet, in-canon online material has become more prominent.

Hoaxes 

A number of hoaxes have involved false documents:
 Salamander Letter
 The Report From Iron Mountain
 The Oera Linda book
 The Hitler Diaries
 The Dossiers Secrets d'Henri Lobineau

See also

 Alternate reality game
 A Racial Program for the Twentieth Century, an anti-Semitic forgery
 Donation of Constantine
 Epistolary novel
 False documentation
 Fictional book
 Fictitious entry
 Forgery
 Found footage (film technique)
 Frame tale
 Literary forgery
 Pseudepigrapha
 Questioned document examination

References

Narratology